Ngasa or Ongamo may refer to:
Ngasa people 
Ngasa language

Language and nationality disambiguation pages